The 1984 North Texas State Mean Green football team was an American football team that represented North Texas State University (now known as the University of North Texas) during the 1984 NCAA Division I-AA football season as a member of the Southland Conference. In their third year under head coach Corky Nelson, the team compiled an 2–9 record.

Schedule

References

North Texas State
North Texas Mean Green football seasons
North Texas State Mean Green football